The 16th Central American Championships in Athletics were held at the Estadio de Atletismo del Instituto Nicaragüense de Deportes in Managua, Nicaragua, between September 25–26, 2004. 

A total of 42 events were contested, 22 by men and 20 by women.

Participation
A total of 183 athletes from 7 countries were reported to participate:

 (4)
 (45)
 (33)
 (13)
 (20)
 (49)
 Panamá (19)

Records
A total of 9 championships records were set.

Medal summary
Complete results and medal winners were published.

Men

Women

Medal table (unofficial)

Note
†: There is a slight difference in silver medals between a published medal table and the unofficial medal count above.

References

 
Central American Championships in Athletics
Central American Championships in Athletics
Central American Championships in Athletics
Sport in Managua
International athletics competitions hosted by Nicaragua